Cassius may refer to:

People
 Cassius, an ancient Roman family name, see Cassia gens
Gaius Cassius Longinus (died 42 BC), Roman senator and a leader of Julius Caesar's assassination
 Avidius Cassius (130–175), usurper Roman Emperor
 Cassius, pen-name of Michael Foot, British politician and writer
 Cassius of Clermont (died c. 260)
 Cassius of Narni (died 558), bishop of Narni
Cassius Marcellus Clay (disambiguation), several people, including:
 Cassius Clay  (1942–2016), birth name of American boxer Muhammad Ali
 Cassius Marcellus Clay Sr. (1912–1989), father of the boxer
 Cassius Marcellus Clay (politician) (1810–1903), American abolitionist, nicknamed the "Lion of White Hall"
 Cassius Dio (c. AD 155 or 163/164 – after 229), Roman historian
 Cassius D. Kalb, an American musician
 Cassius Longinus (disambiguation)
 Cassius Stanley (born 1999), American basketball player
 Cassius Turvey (2007–2022), Aboriginal Australian boy killed in Perth
 Cassius Winston (born 1998), American basketball player

Arts, entertainment, and media
 Cassius (band), a French electronic music duo
 "Cassius" (song), a 2008 song by Foals
 "Cassius", a 2017 song by Fleet Foxes on the album Crack-Up
 Cassius Chrome, a House Robot in Robot Wars
 Cassius Bright, a character in the video game The Legend of Heroes: Trails in the Sky
 Cassius Green, a character in the film Sorry to Bother You
Cassius au Bellona, a character in Pierce Brown's Red Rising series of novels

Other uses
 Cassius (crocodile), the world's largest captive crocodile
 Purple of Cassius, pigment used in stained-glass work

See also
 Chris Hero AKA Kassius Ohno (born 1979), professional wrestler